Ayuready? was a Japanese talk show that ran from 2002 to 2004 which featured Ayumi Hamasaki singing with and interviewing several other pop stars.

Episode guide
01: Guests: Tsunku, Makoto, Takeshi Kitano; Song performed: 'LOVE ~since 1999~' [with Tsunku]
02: Guests: DA PUMP; Song performed: 'If...' [with DA PUMP]
03: Guests: Kuzu; Song performed: '' [with Kuzu]
04: Guests: TRF; Songs performed: '' and 'Crazy Gonna Crazy' [with TRF]
05: Guests: EXILE, Papaya Suzuki, Oyaji Dancers; Song performed: 'Your Eyes Only' [with EXILE]
06: Guests: Fumiya Fujii, Wada Akiko; Song performed: '' [with Wada Akiko]
07: Guests: Porno Graffitti; Songs performed: 'Saudaji' & 'Ageha chou' [with Porno Graffitti]
08: Guests: Fumiya Fujii, Wada Akiko; Song performed: 'True Love' [with Fumiya Fujii]
09: Guests: Akina Nakamori; Songs performed: 'Desire' and 'Shoujo' [with Akina Nakamori]
10: Guests: Every Little Thing; Songs performed: 'Dear My Friend' & 'YOU' [with Every Little Thing]
11: Guests: Kyoko Fukada; Songs performed: 'White Christmas' & 'Dearest' [with Kyoko Fukada]
12: The best moments of programs 1-11, part 1
13: The best moments of programs 1-11, part 2
14: Guests: Kiroro; Song performed: 'Nagai aida' [with Kiroro]
15: Guests: Tatsuya Ishii; Songs performed: 'Kimi ga irudakede' & 'Rouman hikou' [with Tatsuya Ishii]
16: Guests: Hitomi Shimatani, Cocorico; Songs performed: 'Amairo no kami no otome' & 'Papillon' [with Hitomi Shimatani]
17: Guests: Mach25, Tetsu & Tomo; Songs performed: 'Sons of the Sun' & 'A Happy Day' [with Mach25]
18: Guests: Hideaki Tokunaga, Gokurakutonbo; Song performed: '' [with Hideaki Tokunaga]
19: Guests: Hideaki Tokunaga, Gokurakutonbo; Song performed: 'Kowarekake no radio' [with Hideaki Tokunaga]
20: Guests: Matsu Takako, Michiko Shimizu; Songs performed: "Ashita, Haru ga Kitara" & "Ashita ni Kuchizuke o" [with Matsu Takako]
21: Guests: Kenichi Mikawa, Kiyoshi Hikawa; Songs performed: 'Sasoriza no onna' [with Kenichi Mikawa] & 'Kiyoshi no zundokobushi' [with Kiyoshi Hikawa]
22: Guests: Mitsuhiro Oikawa, Hokuyou; Song performed: 'Intense romance' [with Mitsuhiro Oikawa]
23: Guests: Maki Goto, Imada Koji; Songs performed: 'Uwasa no sexy guy' & 'Who...' [with Maki Goto]
24: Guests: Masami Hisamoto, Wada Akiko; Songs performed: 'M' (song by 'Princess') [with Masami Hisamoto] & 'RAINBOW'
25: The best moments of recent programs
26: Guests: Kouichi Iwaki; Song performed: 'Change the World' [with Kouichi Iwaki]
27: Guests: Minimoni; Song performed: 'Rock'n'roll kenchou shozaichi' [with Minimoni]
28: Guests: Kiyoharu; Song performed: 'Masquerade' [with Kiyoharu]
29: Best 10 songs
30: Guests: Sonim; Song performed: 'Curry rice no onna' [with Sonim]
31: Commencement of the 'RAINBOW House' construction
32: Guests: Tamao Nakamura, Sekine Tsutomu; Song performed: 'To Be'
33: Guests: Tetsuya Takeda; Song performed: '' [with Tetsuya Takeda]
34: Guests: Mika Kano, Kyoko Kano; Song performed: 'Can't Take My Eyes Off You' [with Mika Kano]
35: Guests: Mika Kano, Kyoko Kano; No song performed
36: Guests: Hanerutobira; No song performed; Also: progress of works on the 'RAINBOW House'
37: Best moments of recent episodes and progress of works on the 'RAINBOW House'
38: Guests: Anna Umemiya, Jun Nakura; Song performed: 'ourselves'; Also - opening of the 'RAINBOW House'
39: Guests: Toshirou Yanagiba, Kunikazu Katsumata; Song performed: 'Grateful days'
40: Guests: Ken Kaneko, Ken Nakagawa; Song performed: 'ourselves'
41: Guests: Takashi Fujii, Kosugi Kane; Song performed: 'Grateful days'
42: Guests: Maki Ohguro; Song performed: 'La la la' [with Maki Ohguro]
43: Guests: Junichi Ishida, Aida Shouko; Song performed: 'Grateful days'
44: Guests: Yuki (TRF), / Kaori Mochida (Every Little Thing), BoA, Tomiko Van (Do As Infinity) - behind the scenes of a-nation 2003; No song performed
45: Guests: Maki Kuroudo, Zebra; Song performed: 'HANABI ~episode II~'
46: Best of recent episodes in 'RAINBOW House'; Song performed: 'HANABI ~episode II~'
47: Guests: Hideyuki Nakayama, You; Song performed: 'forgiveness'
48: Guests: Jinnai Takanori; Song performed: 'forgiveness'
49: Guests: Dream; Song performed: 'I love world' [with Dream]
50: Guests: Toshisuke Nakamura, Yoshinori Okada, Takashi Tsukamoto; Song performed: '' [with Toshisuke Nakamura]
51: Guests: Tetsuja Tamayama; No song performed
52: Guests: Anri; Song performed: '' [with Anri]
53: Guests: Hanawa; No song performed
54: Guests: Yoshihiro Kai; Song performed: 'Anna' [with Yoshihiro Kai]
55: Guests: Fujiki Naoto; Song performed: 'No way to say'
56: Guests: Shizuka Kudou; No song performed
57: Guests: Shizuka Kudou; Songs performed: 'Koi hitoyo' & 'Arashi no sugao' [with Shizuka Kudou]
58: Guests: W-inds; Song performed: 'Super Lover~I need you tonight~' [with W-inds]
59: Guests: Princess Tenko; Song performed: 'No way to say'
60: Guests: Kouji Kikawa; Song performed: '' [with Kouji Kikawa]
61: Guests: Kick Tha Can Crew; No song performed
62: Guests: Kyoko Fukada; Song performed: 'No way to say'
63: Best parts from recent episodes
64: Guests: Hiroshi Tamaki; Song performed: 'Because of You'
65: Guests: Aikawa Show; Song performed: 'Angel's Song'
66: Guests: Shingo Yanagisawa; Song performed: 'Because of You'
67: Guests: Haruhiko Katou; No song performed
68: Guests: Masayuki Suzuki; Song performed: 'Lonely Chaplin' [with Masayuki Suzuki]
69: Guests: Toshio Kakei; Song performed: 'Memorial address'
70: Guests: Puffy; Song performed: '' [with Puffy]
71: Guests: Hitomi Kuroki; No song performed
72: Guests: Cream Stew; Song performed: 'Moments'
73: Best moments - part 1
74: Best moments - part 2

External links
 http://www.eneabba.net/ayu/video/other/10.ayuready/index.htm

Ayumi Hamasaki
Japanese television talk shows
2002 Japanese television series debuts
2004 Japanese television series endings
2000s television talk shows